Amurensin K is an oligostilbene. It is a resveratrol tetramer found in Vitis amurensis. Preliminary tests have shown it to be an effective neuraminidase inhibitor against the influenza A virus subtype H1N1.

References 

Resveratrol oligomers
Natural phenol tetramers
Grape